Lendl Mark Platter Simmons (born 25 January 1985) is a Trinidadian cricketer who played internationally for the West Indies. He is a right-handed batsman, an occasional right-arm medium pace bowler, and a part-time wicket-keeper. His uncle is former West Indian Test cricketer Phil Simmons. In July 2022, Simmons announced his retirement from international cricket.

Early career
A prominent junior cricketer, he played in both the 2002 Under-19 World Cup in New Zealand and the 2004 Under-19 Cricket World Cup in Bangladesh for the West Indies U-19s. Two years later he made his ODI debut against Pakistan at Faisalabad on 7 December 2006.

Simmons is capable of large scores; with three first class double-centuries to his name, but at the same time he has been prone to inconsistency. His career best of 282, in a first-class match for West Indies A against a touring England XI in January 2009, heralded his Test debut in the final Test of that tour. Simmons scored 24 and 8 as the West Indies secured a series-clinching draw at the Queen's Park Oval, Trinidad. Simmons was retained for the following West Indian tour of England, but has played no further Tests.

T20 franchise career

Indian Premier League
In April 2014 it was announced that Simmons had been signed by Indian Premier League side Mumbai Indians, replacing Jalaj Saxena. This had the aim of improving the team's fortunes, after they had gone without a win in any of their 4 matches prior to his signing. On 22 May 2014, Simmons scored his maiden IPL century helping his team post a 7 wickets win over Kings XI Punjab.

In August 2014, Simmons was travelling in the USA between games for Guyana Amazon Warriors in the Caribbean Premier League when his bat attracted the attention of US customs officials, who apparently believed that it was being used to smuggle illegal drugs. As a consequence, they drilled several holes into the bat.

Simmons was selected for Mumbai Indians for play 2014 IPL and 2015 IPL seasons. He opened the batting with Indian Parthiv Patel during the 2015 season due to injury of Aaron Finch, where they became the most dangerous opening pair of the IPL 8 with an average over 50. Simmons played a major role in the team guided to the IPL 8 win by Mumbai Indians. It was their second title in IPL. Simmons was benched for more than half of the 2017 season but later got the opportunity to open after the departure of Jos Buttler for international duty. Mumbai went on to win the 2017 season as well marking their 3rd win.

He however has remained unsold in the IPL auctions since 2018.

Pakistan Super League
In late 2015 at the 2016 PSL Draft Lendl Simmons was bought and played in the first edition of the tournament for the Karachi Kings. Second & Third picked by Karachi Kings and fourth edition picked by Peshawar Zalmi In 2019 at the 2020 PSL Draft picked by Lahore Qalanders.

Other leagues
On 3 June 2018, he was picked to play for the Winnipeg Hawks in the players' draft for the inaugural edition of the Global T20 Canada tournament. He was the leading run-scorer in the tournament, with 321 runs in eight matches. In June 2019, he was selected to play for the Brampton Wolves franchise team in the 2019 Global T20 Canada tournament. In July 2020, he was named in the Trinbago Knight Riders squad for the 2020 Caribbean Premier League.

International career
Simmons made his Test debut against England on 6 March 2009 and ODI debut against Pakistan on 7 December 2006. He has score two ODI centuries. Though he is very good at ODI and T20I, Simmons has failed in Test cricket, where his highest score is 49 runs against Pakistan. He scored his maiden century in ODIs by scoring 122 against Bangladesh at Shere Bangla National Stadium, Dhaka. His second century came in 2015 Cricket World Cup against Ireland in Nelson, New Zealand. In fact, Ireland upset the West Indies by winning that match by 4 wickets.

In March 2017, he was named in the West Indies squad for the Twenty20 International (T20I) series against Pakistan. In September 2021, Simmons was named in the West Indies' squad for the 2021 ICC Men's T20 World Cup.

References

1985 births
Living people
Cricketers from Port of Spain
West Indies Test cricketers
West Indies One Day International cricketers
Cricketers at the 2007 Cricket World Cup
Cricketers at the 2015 Cricket World Cup
West Indies Twenty20 International cricketers
Trinidad and Tobago cricketers
Guyana Amazon Warriors cricketers
Mumbai Indians cricketers
Karachi Kings cricketers
Peshawar Zalmi cricketers
St Kitts and Nevis Patriots cricketers
Brisbane Heat cricketers
Rangpur Riders cricketers
Khulna Tigers cricketers
Rajshahi Royals cricketers
Saint Lucia Kings cricketers
West Indies B cricketers
Lahore Qalandars cricketers
Wicket-keepers